there are eleven recognized  universities in Uganda, that offer education in law. There is, in addition, one specialised school, the Law Development Centre, that teaches aspects of the law that the universities do not teach. The Centre prepares and tests candidates for the Uganda Bar Examination.

Universities that offer law degrees
The following universities are accredited to offer law degrees.

Public universities
 Makerere University
 Gulu University

Private universities
 Uganda Christian University
 Kampala International University
 Nkumba University
 Islamic University in Uganda
 Uganda Pentecostal University
 Busoga University
 St. Augustine International University
 Bishop Stuart University
 Cavendish University Uganda.
 Victoria University

Admission
Admission to law school in Uganda requires the candidate to have attained the prerequisite minimum score on the A-level national examinations leading to the award of the Uganda Advanced Certificate of Education or UACE, administered by the Uganda National Examinations Board (UNEB). Each university has its pre-entry requirements. Makerere University, the oldest of all of them, administers a pre-entry examination, with a pass mark of 50 percent.

Legal education
The coursework leading to the award of a Bachelor of Laws degree in Uganda, lasts four years. An internship at the undergraduate level is not compulsory. The coursework is divided into compulsory and non-compulsory courses.

The compulsory courses include the following:
 Law of Contract
 Legal Methods
 Introducing Law
 Law of Evidence
 Equity and Trusts
 Law of Tort
 Criminal Law
 Civil Procedure
 Constitutional Law.

These courses are not compulsory:
 Administrative Law
 Conflict of Laws
 Law of Succession
 International Law
 Banking Law
 Taxation & Revenue Law
 International Human Rights Law
 Insurance Law.

Training for the Bar examination
Following the successful completion of the first law degree course, one is admitted to the 9-months course for Postgraduate Diploma in Legal Practice, that allows one to practice as an advocate in the country.

The Law Development Centre (LDC), is the only institution in Uganda, that instructs and examines qualified lawyers for the Bar course. One has to take a pre-entry examination in order to be admitted to the Bar course. An internship lasting 2.5 months is required during the nine-months Bar Course. In order to pass the Bar course, one has to score more than 50 percent in each subject.

Practicing law
Lawyers who have not completed the Bar course may be employed as attorneys or lawyers, at the discretion of the employers. These lawyers cannot appear before a judge in a court of law and cannot represent clients in court.

Foreign-trained lawyers must first take core courses at an accredited Ugandan university, before they can be admitted to the Bar Course. The core courses include (a) Civil Procedure (b) Criminal Procedure and (c) Law of Evidence.

See also
 Judiciary of Uganda

References

External links
 Website of the Uganda Law Council

Education in Uganda